Rudolph Albert Hernández Fuentes (December 10, 1931 – November 23, 2022) was a Dominican Major League Baseball relief pitcher. The ,  right-hander was signed by the New York Giants before the 1950 season.  He was acquired by the original, modern-era Washington Senators from the San Francisco Giants before the 1959 season, and later drafted by the new Washington Senators from the Minnesota Twins in the 1960 MLB expansion draft.

When he made his major league debut on July 3, 1960 Hernández became only the fourth native of the Dominican Republic to play in the major leagues, and the first pitcher.  He preceded Juan Marichal by sixteen days.

Hernández was one of a small number of ballplayers to play for both of the American League's Washington Senators franchises, and one of only three to play for them in consecutive seasons. (Hal Woodeshick and Héctor Maestri are the others.)

Hernández appeared in twenty-one games for the original Washington club, and also appeared in seven games for the expansion Senators. His two-season career totals were 43 innings pitched, 13 games finished, a 4–2 record, and a 4.12 ERA.

His best game occurred on July 9, 1960, when he pitched three scoreless innings of relief to earn a victory against the Baltimore Orioles.

He died in Condado, Puerto Rico on November 23, 2022.

References

External links

Retrosheet

1931 births
2022 deaths
Albuquerque Dukes players
Águilas Cibaeñas players
Charleston Senators players
Chattanooga Lookouts players
Corpus Christi Giants players
Dallas Rangers players
Dominican Republic expatriate baseball players in Canada
Dominican Republic expatriate baseball players in the United States
Gastonia Rockets players
Indianapolis Indians players
Major League Baseball pitchers
Major League Baseball players from the Dominican Republic
Muskogee Giants players
Oshkosh Giants players
People from Santiago de los Caballeros
Portland Beavers players
San Diego Padres (minor league) players
Sioux City Soos players
St. Cloud Rox players
Syracuse Chiefs players
Toronto Maple Leafs (International League) players
Washington Senators (1901–1960) players
Washington Senators (1961–1971) players